Inosaurus (meaning "In Tedreft lizard") is the name given to a dubious genus of theropod dinosaur from the Early Cretaceous-aged "Continental intercalaire" and Early Cretaceous (Albian)-aged Echkar Formation of Niger and possibly from the Late Cretaceous (Cenomanian)-aged Baharija Formation of Egypt The type, and only species, is Inosaurus tedreftensis.

Classification and taxonomy
The type specimen was described by Albert-Félix de Lapparent in 1960, after being discovered by de Lapparent in 1953. The genus was also commented on by de Lapparent in 1959. The binomial name is derived from the location of the site, In Tedreft. De Lapparent based the species on a set of remains found in a single location, a number of vertebrae and the top end of a left tibia. They were probably discovered in a stratum of the Early Cretaceous "Continental intercalaire". He also indicated four other specimens, all vertebrae found in Niger in the Tegama Group, early Albian, as paratypes. All the specimens are part of the collection of the Muséum national d'histoire naturelle in Paris. Apart from these De Lapparent referred three caudal vertebrae, ?IPHG 1912 VIII 63c, ?IPHG 1912 VIII 63e and ?IPHG 1912 VIII 63g, described by Ernst Stromer in 1934 from the Baharija Formation of Egypt to Inosaurus, but they probably belong to an indeterminate theropod unrelated to Inosaurus.
All vertebrae share the same morphology. Despite being from a small animal they are robustly built and very high with enlarged chevron facets and a median groove on the underside.

Inosaurus is today considered a nomen dubium because of the fragmentary nature of the fossils discovered.

References 

Prehistoric theropods
Barremian life
Hauterivian life
Valanginian life
Berriasian life
Early Cretaceous dinosaurs of Africa
Fossils of Niger
Fossil taxa described in 1960
Taxa named by Albert-Félix de Lapparent
Nomina dubia